Yurlov may refer to

Yurlov (surname)
Yurlov Crower, a Russian breed of chicken
7558 Yurlov, a minor planet